Minaeithrips is a genus of thrips in the family Phlaeothripidae.

Species
 Minaeithrips aliceae
 Minaeithrips driesseni

References

Phlaeothripidae
Thrips
Thrips genera